The 2014 Knowsley Metropolitan Borough Council election took place on 22 May 2014 to elect members of Knowsley Metropolitan Borough Council in England. This was on the same day as other local elections.

Election result

Ward results

Shevington Ward

Park Ward

Northwood Ward

Whitefield Ward

Cherryfield Ward

Kirkby Central Ward

Prescot West Ward

Prescot East Ward

Stockbridge Ward

Longview Ward

Page Moss Ward

St. Michael's Ward

St. Bartholomew's Ward

Swanside Ward

Roby Ward

St. Gabriel's Ward

Halewood North Ward

Halewood West Ward

Halewood South Ward

Whiston North Ward

Whiston South Ward

References

2014 English local elections
2014
2010s in Merseyside